Guus Joppen (born 14 November 1989) is a Dutch professional footballer who plays as a right-back for Eerste Divisie club Roda JC. He formerly played for VVV-Venlo, Willem II, NEC and Helmond Sport.

Club career

Helmond Sport
Joppen was born in Eindhoven, and played youth football for UNA before joining the PSV Eindhoven academy in 2000.

In 2006, Joppen moved to the Helmond Sport youth academy, and made his professional debut on 19 October 2007 in a 1–1 Eerste Divisie draw against Cambuur. He came on as a substitute, replacing Sidney Lammens at half-time. On 7 November, he signed his first contract with the club; a one-and-a-half-year deal. Two days later, he scored his first professional goal, opening the score in a 2–1 league win over FC Omniworld.

Joppen played five seasons for Helmond, making 180 total appearances in which he managed to score 13 goals.

VVV-Venlo
On 9 April 2012, it was announced that Joppen had signed a three-year contract with Eredivisie club VVV-Venlo starting from 1 July 2012. He made his official debut for the club on the first matchday of the 2012–13 season, starting in a 1–1 away draw against Heracles Almelo. On 21 August, he scored his first goal for VVV, giving the club a 2–0 lead in the 21st minute of an eventual 3–2 home loss to Feyenoord. Joppen made 36 total appearances for the club that season, scoring once, as VVV suffered relegation through play-offs to Go Ahead Eagles after losing in both legs.

In the following season, as VVV returned to the second tier, Joppen was appointed team captain.

Joppen departed VVV after the 2014–15 Eerste Divisie season, having made 113 total appearances for the club in which he scored four goals.

Willem II
Joppen joined Eredivisie club Willem II on a free on 18 June 2015, signing a two-year contract. He made his debut for the club on the first matchday of the season, replacing Frank van der Struijk in the 88th minute of a 1–1 home draw against Vitesse. On 6 December he scored his first goal for the Tricolores, heading home a free-kick from Lucas Andersen to open the score in the 11th minute of a 3–0 home victory over Cambuur.

Joppen played more sparingly than before during his two seasons at Willem II, making 32 total appearances of which 24 as a starter, and scoring once.

NEC
On 30 June 2017, Joppen signed with NEC, who had just suffered relegation to the Eerste Divisie. He made his debut for the club as a starter on the first matchday in a match against Almere City, but fell out with a muscle injury in the ninth minute of play and was replaced by Michael Heinloth. He made his return to the pitch on 15 September, starting in a 1–1 home draw against FC Emmen. On 25 September, Joppen scored his first goal for NEC in a 3–3 draw against Jong PSV.

At the end of the 2018–19 season, Joppen left NEC as a free agent after 51 appearances for the club in which he scored five goals.

Return to Helmond Sport
On 25 June 2019, Helmond Sport announced the return of Joppen, who had agreed to a two-year contract. He made his return debut for the club on 9 August, marking the occasion with being sent off after his second booking in a 1–1 draw against FC Volendam.

Joppen made 52 total appearances for Helmond Sport after returning, scoring no goals, before leaving as his contract expired in June 2021.

Roda JC
On 25 June 2021, Joppen signed a two-year contract with Eerste Divisie club Roda JC. He immediately established himself as a starter in defense for de Koempels, making his debut for the club on matchday one of the 2021–22 Eerste Divisie season in a 3–0 away victory against De Graafschap at De Vijverberg. He made 36 league starts during his first season at the club, scoring twice, as Roda finished fifth in the league table and were subsequently knocked out in the first round of play-offs for promotion against Excelsior, who would later eventually return to the Eredivisie.

International career
Joppen is a Netherlands youth international, having gained one cap for the national under-19 team: on 6 February 2008, he came on at half-time for Norichio Nieveld in a 2–1 away friendly win over Scotland at Broadwood Stadium.

Throw-ins
Joppen is renowned for his long throw ins. In April 2008, this caused him to have thrombosis in his arm. After having complained of a thick arm, he had to be put in intensive care and went through months of recovery.

Personal life
Joppen grabbed headlines upon signing with NEC, as many, mainly female, followers had liked the club's social media post on their new player. Due to his good looks, he was able to attract a larger crowd of female fans to the Goffertstadion.

In February 2023, Joppen and Roda JC teammate Dylan Vente were involved in a scuffle at a night club in Heerlen during Carnival celebrations, which left both with injuries. A man was later arrested, who had attacked Joppen and Vente.

Career statistics

References

External links
 
 Guus Joppen at Voetbal International 

1989 births
Living people
21st-century Dutch people
Footballers from Eindhoven
Association football defenders
Dutch footballers
Netherlands youth international footballers
Eredivisie players
Eerste Divisie players
VV UNA players
PSV Eindhoven players
Helmond Sport players
VVV-Venlo players
Willem II (football club) players
NEC Nijmegen players
Roda JC Kerkrade players